The St. Rita's Colored Catholic Mission is a historic building in New Smyrna Beach, Florida, United States. Built in 1899 as Sacred Heart Catholic Church on Faulkner Street, it was relocated to 314 Duss Street in 1956 to serve as a Catholic Mission to the African-American community. Today, it is the Mary S. Harrell Black Heritage Museum. On April 13, 2007, the building was added to the U.S. National Register of Historic Places.

References

External links

National Register of Historic Places in Volusia County, Florida
Museums in Volusia County, Florida
African-American museums in Florida
Buildings and structures in New Smyrna Beach, Florida